The 2005 UEFA Women's Under-19 Championship was the holding of the UEFA Women's Under-19 Championship in Hungary from July 20–31, 2005. Russia won this edition of the competition in the final against France.

Participating teams
Eight national teams participated—seven which qualified from earlier stages, plus Hungary, which received an automatic berth as the host nation. They were split into two groups of four: Group A and Group B. Each team in a group played each other once, with the top two teams in each group progressing to the semi-finals. The winner faced the runner-up of the other group in a play-off, with the winner of each semi-final advancing to the final to determine the champion.

A fifth-place playoff had to be made because Russia, host of the 2006 FIFA U-20 Women's World Championship, progressed to the semi-final. All semi-finalists of the UEFA Women's Under-19 Championship qualified to the FIFA U-20 Women's World Championship.

Group A

Group B

Stadia used for tournament
 ZTE Arena, Zalaegerszeg
 Perutz Stadium, Pápa
 Bük
 Andráshida

Results

Group stage

Group A

Group B

Knockout stage

Fifth Place Playoff

Semi-finals

Final

Awards

Goalscorers
9 goals
  Elena Danilova

5 goals
  Vanessa Bürki

4 goals
  Eniola Aluko
  Linda Sällström
  Célia Okoyino da Mbabi

3 goals
  Elodie Thomis

2 goals

  Marie Pierre Castera
  Morgane Courteille
  Anna Blässe
  Elena Terekhova
  Martina Moser

1 goal

  Karen Carney
  Lianne Sanderson
  Taru Laihanen
  Leena Puranen
  Essi Sainio
  Marie-Laure Delie
  Louisa Necib
  Julie Peruzzetto
  Nicole Banecki
  Patricia Hanebeck
  Isabel Kerschowski
  Simone Laudehr
  Annika Niemeier
  Réka Jakab
  Elena Morozova
  Fay Hughes
  Pamela Liddell
  Caroline Abbé
  Vanessa Bernauer
  Katrin Eggenberger

own goal
  Hollie Thomson (playing against France)

References

Women
2005
2005 in women's association football
2005
Uefa
2005–06 in Hungarian football
July 2005 sports events in Europe
2005 in youth association football